Roblex Aviation was a cargo airline based in Puerto Rico.  This airline started flying in 1997 throughout the Caribbean and surrounding areas.  The airline had two bases in Puerto Rico, one at San Juan's Luis Muñoz Marín International Airport and another at the former Air Force base in Aguadilla, now known as Rafael Hernandez Airport.

Fleet 

As of July 2013 the Roblex Aviation fleet included:

4 Shorts 360-300

Bankruptcy 

On January 8, 2011, Roblex Aviation filed Chapter 11 bankruptcy. As reported by Caribbean Business, Roblex Aviation was one of the top 15 commercial bankruptcy filings in Puerto Rico also filed again in June 2013. Pilots and mechanics are currently fired by the administration since July 13, 2013 as no money is available to continue the operation and fix the last aircraft of the fleet.

Accidents and incidents
On 4 April 2001, Douglas DC-3A N19BA  ditched in the sea off Luis Muñoz Marín International Airport, Carolina, Puerto Rico after suffering a double engine failure while on a local training flight. Both crew escaped. Damage to the aircraft was described as minor.

References

External links

 
 
 

Defunct airlines of Puerto Rico